Márcia Lemos Kubitschek de Oliveira (22 October 1943–5 August 2000) was a Brazilian journalist and politician. The daughter of former president Juscelino Kubitschek and Sarah Kubitschek, she served as a federal deputy and as vice-governor of the Federal District.

References

Members of the Chamber of Deputies (Brazil) from the Federal District
20th-century Brazilian women politicians
1943 births
2000 deaths